Bedtime is a popular parenting tradition.

Bedtime may also refer to:

 "Bedtime" (song), a 1997 R&B song
 Bedtime (TV series), a British comedy-drama television programme